The Musée de la Chartreuse is an art museum in a former Carthusian monastery in Douai, France. It is the 'musée des Beaux-Arts' for the city.

Building 

Built by Jacques d'Abancourt in brick and stone in the Renaissance style, on the site of the house of the "Colombier", the hôtel d'Abancourt (1559) with its round tower was extended in 1608 by Jean de Montmorency, who added a square building in the same style with a square tower. In 1623 it was acquired by the Premonstratensians of Furnes. It finally saw itself become a home for Carthusian monks in the middle of the 17th century, via the construction of a chapter house and a small cloister (1663), a refectory (1687), the prior's lodgings (1690) and finally - after a large cloister and cells which were demolished in the 19th century - a chapel in the Jesuit style (not restored yet). On the French Revolution the building was turned over to military use and it was later damaged by bombing in 1944. It was bought by the city in 1951 and from 1958 was used to replace the buildings housing the city's musée des Beaux-Arts, which had been destroyed in the Second World War at the same time as the neighbouring boys' lycée.

The current museum complex includes several 16th, 17th and 18th century buildings. To its left is the hôtel d'Abancourt-Montmorency, built between 1559 and 1608 in the Flemish Renaissance style. Built in the classical style at the start of the 18th century, the complex's church is made up of a vast nave and five side chapels. After a six-year restoration campaign, this church was used to display objets d'art and sculptures to the public, with the 19th century sculptures in the nave and objets d'art in the side chapels, including medieval goldwork and a series of bronzes and terracottas by Giambologna, who was born in Douai.

The ancient convent is listed as a Monument historique since 1930 by the French Ministry of Culture.

Donors 
 1852 - Théophile Bra gave the works in his studio
 1857 - Doctor Escalier gave his collection of 176 Flemish and Dutch paintings
 1877 - Foucques de Wagnonville bequeathed the museum his collection, including several statues by Giambologna
 Unknown date - Jean-Baptiste Fortier left the museum a sum of money allowing the purchase of works by Veronese, Rubens and Gustave Courbet

Curators 
 Jacques Guillouet
 Anne Labourdette since 2007

Permanent collections 
Over 100 works are on show, chronologically retracing the evolution of European painting from the Middle Ages to modern art.

Works on show 
 The Venetian Woman and Portrait of a Lady (1565) by Paul Veronese (1528–1588)
 The Flagellation by Carracci
 The Virgin, Protectress of the Cistercians by Jehan Bellegambe, oil on wood (16th century)
 Le Four des Maures by Henri-Edmond Cross, oil on canvas (1906)
 The rose garden in Monaco by Henri-Edmond Cross, oil on canvas (1884)
 The Friends of Fontvieille by Félix Labisse, oil on canvas (1945)
 Instituto de arte moderno Paraguay 665 by Félix Labisse, canvas poster
 The death of Abel by Alexandre Descatoire, sculpture
 The Marchiennes Polyptych by Jan van Scorel (16th century), produced for the Abbaye de Marchiennes.
 The Anchin Polyptych by Jehan Bellegambe

Gallery

Temporary exhibitions 
The museum also organises temporary exhibitions, such as Douai, d'un siècle à l'autre (1999, presenting the plan for the reconstruction of Douai drawn up by the architects Alexandre Miniac and Petit, on the initiative of the Secretary of State for Reconstruction). Others include:
 Au cirque, le peintre et le saltimbanque, shown at the Musée de la Chartreuse de Douai 9 April-18 July 2004. Commissariat Général : Françoise Baligand & Zéev Gourarier.
Catalogue : Au cirque, le peintre et le saltimbanque, collectif, Musée de la Chartreuse, Douai - Somogy Éditions d'Art, Paris (2004). .

External links 

 Official site
 Musée de la Chartreuse: Ancien couvent des chartreux
 Musenor digital archive, Association des Conservateurs des Musées des Hauts-de-France

References 

Chartreuse De Douai
Chartreuse De Douai
Buildings and structures in Douai
Chartreuse De Douai
Chartreuse De Douai
1958 establishments in France